Pyšely is a town in Benešov District in the Central Bohemian Region of the Czech Republic. It has about 2,100 inhabitants.

Administrative parts
Villages of Borová Lhota, Kovářovice, Nová Ves and Zaječice are administrative parts of Pyšely.

Geography
It lies in the Benešov Uplands.

History
The first written mention of Pyšely is from 1315. The village was promoted to a town by Emperor Leopold I in 1703. After Pyšely ceased to be a town after the World War II, its town title was restored in 2007.

Sights

The main landmark of the town is the Pyšely Castle. The castle was first documented in 1587, when it was reconstructed in the Renaissance style. Later it was baroque rebuilt. The castle was gradually expanded and a castle park was founded. Since 1956, the building has served as a retirement home.

The Church of the Exaltation of the Holy Cross has a Romanesque origin and probably dates from the 12th century. Its present appearance is the result of extensive reconstructions in the years 1781–1783 and 1861–1862. Next to the church is a rectory, built between 1763 and 1765.

On a hill above the town in the baroque Chapel of the Virgin Mary. It dates from 1699.

Notable people
Emanuel Rádl (1873–1942), biologist and philosopher

References

External links

Cities and towns in the Czech Republic
Populated places in Benešov District